In fluid dynamics the Morison equation is a semi-empirical equation for the inline force on a body in oscillatory flow. It is sometimes called the MOJS equation after all four authors—Morison, O'Brien, Johnson and Schaaf—of the 1950 paper in which the equation was introduced. The Morison equation is used to estimate the wave loads in the design of oil platforms and other offshore structures.

Description

The Morison equation is the sum of two force components: an inertia force in phase with the local flow acceleration and a drag force proportional to the (signed) square of the instantaneous flow velocity. The inertia force is of the functional form as found in potential flow theory, while the drag force has the form as found for a body placed in a steady flow. In the heuristic approach of Morison, O'Brien, Johnson and Schaaf these two force components, inertia and drag, are simply added to describe the inline force in an oscillatory flow. The transverse force—perpendicular to the flow direction, due to vortex shedding—has to be addressed separately.

The Morison equation contains two empirical hydrodynamic coefficients—an inertia coefficient and a drag coefficient—which are determined from experimental data. As shown by dimensional analysis and in experiments by Sarpkaya, these coefficients depend in general on the Keulegan–Carpenter number, Reynolds number and surface roughness.

The descriptions given below of the Morison equation are for uni-directional onflow conditions as well as body motion.

Fixed body in an oscillatory flow
In an oscillatory flow with flow velocity , the Morison equation gives the inline force parallel to the flow direction:

where
  is the total inline force on the object,
  is the flow acceleration, i.e. the time derivative of the flow velocity 
 the inertia force , is the sum of the Froude–Krylov force  and the hydrodynamic mass force 
 the drag force  according to the drag equation,
  is the inertia coefficient, and  the added mass coefficient,
 A is a reference area, e.g. the cross-sectional area of the body perpendicular to the flow direction,
 V is volume of the body.

As a result,  is the total force per unit cylinder length:

Besides the inline force, there are also oscillatory lift forces perpendicular to the flow direction, due to vortex shedding. These are not covered by the Morison equation, which is only for the inline forces.

Moving body in an oscillatory flow
In case the body moves as well, with velocity , the Morison equation becomes:

where the total force contributions are:
 a: Froude–Krylov force,
 b: hydrodynamic mass force,
 c: drag force.

Limitations
The Morison equation is a heuristic formulation of the force fluctuations in an oscillatory flow. The first assumption is that the flow acceleration is more-or-less uniform at the location of the body. For instance, for a vertical cylinder in surface gravity waves this requires that the diameter of the cylinder is much smaller than the wavelength. If the diameter of the body is not small compared to the wavelength, diffraction effects have to be taken into account.
Second, it is assumed that the asymptotic forms: the inertia and drag force contributions, valid for very small and very large Keulegan–Carpenter numbers respectively, can just be added to describe the force fluctuations at intermediate Keulegan–Carpenter numbers. However, from experiments it is found that in this intermediate regime—where both drag and inertia are giving significant contributions—the Morison equation is not capable of describing the force history very well. Although the inertia and drag coefficients can be tuned to give the correct extreme values of the force.
Third, when extended to orbital flow which is a case of non uni-directional flow, for instance encountered by a horizontal cylinder under waves, the Morison equation does not give a good representation of the forces as a function of time.

References

Further reading 

, 530 pages

Fluid dynamics
Equations of fluid dynamics
Water waves
Articles containing video clips
Marine engineering